Lerdo de Tejada Station is a station on Line 1 of the Monterrey Metro. It is located on Juárez and Lerdo de Tejada Avenues in Guadalupe, Nuevo León, Mexico.

This station serves the heavily populated Canteras neighborhood. It is near La Pastora Zoo Park. It is accessible for people with disabilities.

This station is named after Lerdo de Tejada Avenue, and its logo represents a quill since the street is named after Sebastian Lerdo de Tejada, a Mexican jurist, and former President of México.

This station was a ghost station for several years, it was opened to the public on May 21, 1995.

References

Metrorrey stations
Railway stations opened in 1995